Synclinostyles is a genus of flowering plants belonging to the family Apiaceae.

Its native range is Himalaya.

Species:

Synclinostyles denisjordanii 
Synclinostyles exadversum

References

Apioideae
Apioideae genera